Archduchess Adelheid of Austria (3 January 1914 – 2 October 1971) was an archduchess of Austria, as the daughter of Emperor Charles I of Austria and Empress Zita.

Biography

Early years 
Archduchess Adelheid was born on 3 January 1914, in the Schloss Hetzendorf. She was the second child and eldest daughter of Archduke Charles of Austria and his wife, Zita of Bourbon-Parma. On 7 January 1914 she was baptised by Friedrich Gustav Piffl; her baptismal names were: Adelheid Maria Josepha Sixta Antonia Roberta Ottonia Zita Charlotte Luise Immakulata Pia Theresia Beatrix Franziska Isabella Henriette Maximiliana Genoveva Ignatia Marcus d'Aviano. Her godparents that stood for her were her father’s mother, Princess Maria Josepha of Saxony, and her mother’s brother Prince Sixtus of Bourbon-Parma.

On 21 November 1916, Adelheid's great-grand uncle, Emperor Franz Joseph, died and her father succeeded him as emperor of Austria and king of Hungary. During World War I Adelheid would often accompany her brother, Crown Prince Otto, and father on trips to inspect the Austrian troops.

Following the Austro-Hungarian Empire's defeat in the war, her father was forced to renounce participation in state affairs and subsequently the empire was dismantled—and republics were established in Austria and Hungary. In 1919, Adelheid and her family were sent into exile, first in Switzerland and lastly in the Island of Madeira. 

On 9 March 1922, Adelheid was with her brother Otto and father when he went into town to buy toys for Carl Ludwig’s birthday. On the way back, they were enveloped by chill mists; due to this, her father caught a cold that later developed into pneumonia, from which he died on 1 April.

Later life 
In December 1933 she became the first member of her family to set foot in Vienna since the establishment of the republic, when she arrived by train from Budapest. Adelheid attended the University of Louvain and gained a doctorate in 1938. During World War II she emigrated with most of her family to the United States to escape the Nazis; she would later return to Europe.

On 2 October 1971, Adelheid died unmarried and childless in Pöcking, Bavaria, aged 57. She is currently buried in the Tulfes Friedhof.

Ancestry

References

1914 births
1971 deaths
House of Habsburg-Lorraine
Austrian princesses
Catholic University of Leuven (1834–1968) alumni
Austrian Roman Catholics
20th-century Christians
20th-century Roman Catholics
20th-century Austrian people
20th-century Austrian women
People from Meidling
Austrian exiles
Austrian emigrants to Switzerland
Austrian emigrants to the United States
Austrian emigrants to Germany
Daughters of emperors
Children of Charles I of Austria
Daughters of kings